Charles Gordon McLeod (27 December 1890 – 16 October 1963) was an English actor. He was born in Market Giffard, Ivybridge, Devon.

His film appearances include Chance of a Lifetime and The Silent Passenger, but he is best known for his recurring appearance as the character Claud Eustace Teal in films such as The Saint Meets the Tiger.

Filmography

 A Smart Set (1919)
 Mixed Doubles (1933)
 Brides to Be (1934)
 Borrow a Million (1934)
 The Case for the Crown (1934)
 Lucky Loser (1934)
 The Primrose Path (1934)
 The Crimson Circle (1936)
 Talk of the Devil (1936)
 Nothing Like Publicity (1936) 
 The Frog (1937)
 The Squeaker (1937)
 Victoria the Great (1937)
 Dangerous Medicine (1938) 
 I See Ice (1938)
 Double or Quits (1938)
 Lucky to Me (1939)
 Hoots Mon! (1940)
 That's the Ticket (1940)
 Two for Danger (1940)
 This Man Is Dangerous (1941)
 The Prime Minister (1941)
 Banana Ridge (1942)
 We'll Smile Again (1942)
 The Saint Meets the Tiger (1943)
 He Snoops to Conquer (1944)
 I Didn't Do It (1945)
 I'll Be Your Sweetheart (1945)
 Meet Sexton Blake  (1945)
 The Winslow Boy (1948)
 Floodtide (1949)
 Chance of a Lifetime (1950)
 Once a Sinner (1950)
 Four Days (1951)
 A Case for PC 49'' (1951)

References

External links
  9306

1890 births
1961 deaths
English male stage actors
English male film actors
English male television actors
People from Ivybridge
20th-century English male actors
Male actors from Devon